The Slower Speeds Initiative is a UK single issue coalition pressure group. It is an unincorporated association, controlled by its management committee, made up of representatives of its founder organisations. Its aims are "to raise awareness of the consequences of inappropriate speeds of road vehicles, to stimulate and contribute to the discussion on vehicle speeds and means of reducing inappropriate speeds and to achieve changes in government policy, driver behaviour and other relevant areas to reduce speeds".

The group advocates:
 lower and better enforced speed limits, including on high quality roads, where "by discouraging longer journeys they would help to restrain traffic growth and improve the competitiveness of public transport for longer journeys".
 more resources for speed reduction 
 what they see as more responsible attitudes to speed 
 changes in the law to reflect the seriousness of speeding offences 
 the introduction of variable speed limiters

History 
In 1998 the Slower Speeds Initiative was founded by the following organisations:
 Campaign for Better Transport (formally 'Transport 2000')
 Children's Play Council
 Cyclists' Touring Club (CTC)
 Environmental Transport Association (ETA)
 Living Streets (formally Pedestrian Association)
 RoadPeace
 Sustrans

Of the organisations above, Sustrans, Living Streets, the ETA and the Cyclists' Touring Club are affiliates of the CBT itself as well as supporting the Initiative.

References

External links 
 

Road safety
Road safety in the United Kingdom